Glanidium leopardum is a species of driftwood catfishes found in the coastal rivers of the Guianas in South America.

References

Soares-Porto, L.M., 1998. Monophyly and interrelationships of the Centromochlinae (Siluriformes: Auchenipteridae). p. 331-350. In L.R. Malabarba, R.E. Reis, R.P. Vari, Z.M.S. Lucena and C.A.S. Lucena (eds.) Phylogeny and classification of neotropical fishes. Porto Alegre: EDIPUCRS. 

Catfish of South America
Taxa named by Jacobus Johannes Hoedeman
Fish described in 1961
Auchenipteridae